Casey Bromilow is an Australian professional rugby league football coach. He currently works for the Newcastle Knights and was the inaugural head coach of the NRL Women's Premiership side.

Background
Bromilow is of English descent.

Playing career
After his playing career, Bromilow moved into rugby league administration roles.

Coaching career

Newcastle Knights
In 2018, Bromilow joined the Newcastle Knights as team manager of their Tarsha Gale Cup side. In 2019, he moved into the role of club Elite Pathway Programs Manager. At the end of 2020, he was announced as the head coach of the Tarsha Gale Cup team. In November 2021, he was announced as the head coach of the Knights' inaugural NRLW team. Ahead of the 2022 NRLW season, he was appointed the Knights' Elite Pathways Program Manager, with Ronald Griffiths replacing him as NRLW head coach.

References

External links
Newcastle Knights profile

Australian people of English descent
Australian rugby league coaches
Newcastle Knights (NRLW) coaches
Living people
Year of birth missing (living people)